Liquid Snake is a fictional character from the Metal Gear franchise. He is the twin brother of series protagonist Solid Snake and the second product of Les Enfants Terribles, a top-secret government project to artificially create soldiers by cloning the legendary soldier Big Boss. He first appears as the central antagonist in the original Metal Gear Solid, where he leads the rogue FOXHOUND unit in a hostile takeover of a nuclear disposal facility in Alaska. The character returns in Metal Gear Solid V: The Phantom Pain as a child mercenary nicknamed the White Mamba with his real name revealed to be Eli.

Appearances

Metal Gear Solid

 was raised in the United Kingdom following his birth, and served as an operative for the British SAS and later became the field commander of FOXHOUND during Metal Gear Solid, leading Revolver Ocelot, Psycho Mantis, Sniper Wolf, Vulcan Raven,  Decoy Octopus and the Genome Soldiers. He leads the hostile takeover of Shadow Moses Island to acquire Big Boss's remains and use his genetic information to treat the mutations affecting his subordinates, the Genome Army. Liquid harbors a strong resentment towards his twin brother Solid Snake, as he mistakenly believes that Snake received Big Boss's superior genes, while he was given only the flawed genes. In reality, it is Liquid who carries superior genes.

Snake first meets Liquid after he is taken captive by the enemy and imprisoned in a medical room. The two brothers battle each other multiple times throughout the story. First, Liquid tries to kill Snake by piloting a Hind D and pursuing him across the Communication Towers, but Snake destroys the helicopter with anti-air Stinger missiles. Afterward, Liquid manipulates Snake into activating Metal Gear REX by disguising himself as Master Miller. Snake destroys REX, but falls unconscious in the aftermath, allowing Liquid to take his unconscious brother to the top of the ruined REX and challenge him to a fistfight. Snake prevails, but Liquid survives again and pursues Snake in a jeep chase that results in a crash outside the island's facility. Just as he approaches a trapped Snake, Liquid suddenly succumbs to the FOXDIE virus that had been injected into his twin brother. Liquid's death leaves Snake in doubt of his own survival, as FOXDIE targets its victims based on specific DNA.

Metal Gear Solid 2: Sons of Liberty

Liquid's right arm was transplanted posthumously to his former henchman as a replacement. This results in Liquid's personality manifesting itself within Ocelot whenever Solid Snake is nearby, causing Ocelot to adopt Liquid's voice and mannerisms. This happens for the first time when Snake confronts Ocelot during the hijacking of Metal Gear RAY from the disguised tanker. The rest of Liquid's body was being kept by an unspecified agency until it was stolen by Snake and Hal Emmerich to fake the former's death. Liquid's mind manifests within Ocelot once again during the final confrontation atop Arsenal Gear, at the cilmax of Solidus Snake's takeover again with the intent of rebelling against The Patriots. Liquid was the one to send Arsenal Gear crashing into Manhattan 
(which was explicitly cut from the final release due to the September 11 attacks).

Metal Gear Solid 4: Guns of the Patriots

Liquid's consciousness seemingly takes over his host's body completely as a new personality: Liquid Ocelot. However, Liquid's persona is ultimately revealed to be an elaborate facade by Ocelot, made possible through a process of self-hypnosis, in order to trick the A.I. controlling the Sons of the Patriots system. The rest of Liquid's remains were used as spare body parts for Big Boss's restoration.

Metal Gear Solid V

The Phantom Pain

Liquid Snake's next official appearance is in a prequel. The youth is a 12-year-old child soldier named  who fled from his home in England after learning about his nature as a clone.

The player first encounters Eli in Masa Village after it is taken over by Eli's group in Episode 23. After the player subdues Eli, he is taken into Mother Base where the Diamond Dogs staff try to re-educate him and integrate him into normal society along with the other child soldiers. However, Eli resists this treatment and rebels against the Mother Base staff, focusing his hostility on their leader Venom Snake, whom he mistakenly believes to be his biological father (unaware of his true nature as Big Boss's body double, as revealed in Episode 46).

When Eli sneaks into a chopper during Snake's deployment to OKB Zero in Kabul during the events of Episode 31, he catches the attention of the young psychic known as the Third Child, who uses Eli's will to activate Sahelanthropus and attack Snake. After Sahelanthropus is neutralized and transferred to Mother Base, the Third Child infiltrates the place and befriends Eli, giving him a vial containing the English strain of Skull Face's vocal cord parasite. The two plot out an elaborate escape plan which involves helping other child soldiers escape and fixing Sahelanthropus with the assistance of its creator Dr. Emmerich. Ultimately, Eli succeeds in reactivating Sahelanthropus and hijacks it from Mother Base, escaping alongside the Third Child and the other child mercenaries.

"Kingdom of the Flies"
"Kingdom of the Flies", also known as Episode 51, is a mission omitted from the released version of Metal Gear Solid V that would have depicted Eli's actions following his escape from Mother Base. Video of this mission is featured in a Blu-ray disc included with the limited edition release of the game, depicting its events through concept art and partially completed cutscenes.

The mission has Snake pursuing Eli's group in an unnamed African island surrounded by saltwater, where the English strain of the vocal cord parasite has been spread to prevent access to adults. Snake confronts Eli and a battle ensues between the reactivated Sahelanthropus and a battalion of Diamond Dogs soldiers. Eli is defeated, but Snake is forced to abandon him when he displays signs of infections, realizing that Eli has lost his immunity to the parasites as a result of undergoing puberty. Before Eli can die, the Third Child arrives and uses his psychic powers to remove the parasite within him. The two young friends escape just as Diamond Dogs launches a Napalm airstrike to cleanse the island of the parasites. The video ends on an image of the Manhattan skyline, with Eli vowing revenge.

Concept and design

Physical appearance
Liquid Snake is almost identical to Solid Snake in terms of facial appearance and physique, with the only difference between them being Liquid's darker skin tone and medium-length blond hair. He has a tattoo of a snake entwined around a sword on his left arm, with concept art also showing a small piercing on his left ear and dog tags around his neck. For most of Metal Gear Solid, Liquid is dressed in a brown trenchcoat but fights shirtless when he confronts Snake at the end of the game. When he disguises himself as Master Miller, he ties his hair in a ponytail and wears a pair of sunglasses, changing the tone of his voice as well. In Metal Gear Solid 2, when Liquid possesses Ocelot, his physical appearance changes as well, exposing the surgically attached right arm and letting his hair loose.

Eli in Metal Gear Solid V wears a wardrobe similar to his older self, consisting of a green jacket with no shirt and shorts. The back of his jacket has a drawing of a pig with an eye patch meant to resemble Big Boss and the phrase "Never Be Game Over" atop of it. Underneath the pig, the kanji 液体人間 (ekitai ningen), which means "liquid person", can be seen.

Casting
In the original Metal Gear Solid, Liquid Snake was voiced by Banjō Ginga in the Japanese version and by Cam Clarke (credited as James Flinders in the PlayStation release) in the English version. Both actors would reprise the role in Metal Gear Solid 2. Stuntman Mark Musashi provided Liquid Snake's motion capture for Metal Gear Solid: The Twin Snakes. The character's young version in Metal Gear Solid V was voiced by Piers Stubbs, who also provided facial capture, while his motion capture was performed by Vincent Giry. Yūtarō Honjō dubbed the character's voice for the Japanese version.

Reception
In 1999, readers of GameSpot voted Liquid Snake into the list of top ten video game villains. IGN included him in their 2011 list of top 100 video game villains, as number 53. He was ranked as the 16th-coolest video game villain by Complex in 2012. GameDaily ranked him ninth on their "Top 25 Evil Masterminds of All Time". Liquid ranked first on IGN's 2008 list of the Metal Gear series' top ten villains, also placing as seventh on their list of top ten Metal Gear boss battles. Play ranked Liquid Snake the fifth-best Metal Gear character, adding he "has become one of the most iconic villains of the franchise and is still one of its most popular characters."

Liquid was included on GamesRadar+ 2008 list of "outrageously camp bad guys" at fifth place, also giving honourable mention on their list of "mega plot twists you never saw coming" to finding out Master Miller is actually Liquid Snake. In 2011, UGO Networks ranked Liquid as the fourth-scariest fictional terrorist in entertainment, also featuring him revealing himself in Metal Gear Solid on the list of the most shocking twists in gaming. In 2012, GamesRadar+ featured both him and Solidus Snake at second place on the list of most evil clones in gaming, commenting that "as evil clones go, the ones that threaten the world with thermonuclear war and eradication rank as some of the worst," and also listing him and Solid Snake as having one of the best brotherly rivalries in gaming. IGN also remarked their rivalry, saying "Few rivalries in games have spanned as massive and confusing a timeline as Solid Snake and Liquid Snake".

References

Bibliography

Characters designed by Yoji Shinkawa
Child characters in video games
Clone characters in video games
Fictional assassins in video games
Fictional criminals in video games
Fictional child soldiers
Fictional English people in video games
Fictional Gulf War veterans
Fictional British Army personnel
Fictional characters with accelerated ageing
Fictional prisoners of war
Fictional SIS agents
Fictional murderers
Fictional super soldiers
Fictional Special Air Service personnel
Genetically engineered characters in video games
Konami antagonists
Male characters in video games
Fictional mercenaries in video games
Metal Gear characters
Fictional military personnel in video games
Fictional terrorists
Fictional secret agents and spies in video games
Twin characters in video games
Video game bosses
Video game characters introduced in 1998